Banfora is a department or commune of Comoé Province in southern Burkina Faso. Its capital is the town of Banfora. According to the 2019 census the department has a total population of 160,282.

Towns and villages
 Banfora	(117,452 inhabitants) (capital)
 Bodadiougou	(1,290 inhabitants)
 Bombora	(1,057 inhabitants)
 Diarabakoko	(1,882 inhabitants)
 Diongolo	(2,405 inhabitants)
 Dionouna	(1,312 inhabitants)
 Karfiguela	(890 inhabitants)
 Kitobama	(179 inhabitants)
 Korokora	(304 inhabitants)
 Lemouroudougou	(1,060 inhabitants)
 Marebama	(262 inhabitants)
 Nekanklou	(903 inhabitants)
 Niankar	(1,529 inhabitants)
 Niarebama	(262 inhabitants)
 Siniena	(3,702 inhabitants)
 Sitiena	(1,857 inhabitants)
 Tangora	(2,290 inhabitants)
 Tengrela	(3,908 inhabitants)
 Tiekouna	(108 inhabitants)
 Tionouna	(719 inhabitants)
 Tiempagora	(907 inhabitants)
 Tiontionmana	(217 inhabitants)
 Toumousseni	(3,245 inhabitants)

References

Departments of Burkina Faso
Comoé Province

it:Banfora